Incara multisquamatus is a species of fish in the family Butidae known from brackish waters along the coasts of India and Australia. This species is the only known member of its genus.

References

Butidae
Monotypic fish genera